The 2019–20 Kansas State Wildcats men's basketball team represent Kansas State University in the 2019–20 NCAA Division I men's basketball season, their 117 basketball season. Their head coach is Bruce Weber in his eighth year at the helm of the Wildcats. The team plays its home games in Bramlage Coliseum in Manhattan, Kansas as members of the Big 12 Conference. They are the defending Big 12 regular season Co-Champions.

Previous season
The Wildcats finished the 2018–19 season 25–9, 14–4 in Big 12 play and were the 2018-19 Big 12 Regular Season Co-Champions. They defeated TCU in the quarterfinals of the Big 12 tournament before losing to Iowa State in the semifinals. They received an at-large bid to the NCAA tournament as the No. 4 seed in the South region. There they lost to UC Irvine.

Offseason

Departures

Incoming transfers

2019 recruiting class

Roster

Schedule and results

|-
!colspan=12 style=|Exhibition

|-
!colspan=12 style="|Regular season

|-
!colspan=12 style=| Big 12 tournament

|- style="background:#bbbbbb"
| style="text-align:center"|Mar 12, 20206:00 pm, ESPN2
| style="text-align:center"| (10)
| vs. (2) No. 5 BaylorQuarterfinals
| colspan=5 rowspan=1 style="text-align:center"|Cancelled due to the COVID-19 pandemic
| style="text-align:center"|Sprint CenterKansas City, MO

Rankings

*AP does not release post-NCAA tournament rankings^Coaches did not release a Week 2 poll.

References

Kansas State Wildcats men's basketball seasons
Kansas State
2019 in sports in Kansas
Kansas